The II Skarpnäcksloppet was a non-championship Formula One motor race held at Skarpnäck Airfield, Skarpnäck, Stockholm on 14 September 1952. The race was won by Gunnar Carlsson in a Mercury Special.

Results

References

Skarpnäcksloppet
Skarpnäcksloppet
Skarpnäcksloppet